Lifeboat may refer to:

Rescue vessels 

 Lifeboat (shipboard), a small craft aboard a ship to allow for emergency escape
 Lifeboat (rescue), a boat designed for sea rescues
 Airborne lifeboat, an air-dropped boat used to save downed airmen

Art and entertainment 
 Lifeboat (1944 film), a movie directed by Alfred Hitchcock
 Lifeboat (2018 film), a documentary
 "Lifeboat" (Stargate SG-1), a television episode from the TV series
 Lifeboat sketch, a sketch shown on Monty Python's Flying Circus
 Lifeboat, a 1972 album by the Sutherland Brothers
 Lifeboat, a 2008 album by Jimmy Herring
 "Lifeboats", a song on Snow Patrol's 2008 album, A Hundred Million Suns
 "Lifeboat", a song from Heathers: The Musical

Other uses 
 Lifeboat, journal of the Royal National Lifeboat Institution
 Lifeboat ethics, proposed by Garret Hardin based on the metaphor of a lifeboat
 Lifeboat Associates, a software distributor and magazine publisher in the 1970s and 1980s
 Lifeboat Distribution, an international software distributor
 Lifeboat Foundation, an existential risk reduction organization